Nkandla is a genus of moths belonging to the subfamily Tortricinae of the family Tortricidae. The genus was erected by Józef Razowski and John Wesley Brown in 2009.

Species
Nkandla flavisecta (Meyrick, 1918)
Nkandla macrostoma (Meyrick, 1920)

Etymology
The genus name refers to Nkandla, KwaZulu-Natal, South Africa, the collecting locality of some of the specimens.

See also
List of Tortricidae genera

References

Razowski, J. & Brown, J. W. (2009). "Records of Tortricidae from the Afrotropical Region, with descriptions of new taxa (Lepidoptera: Tortricidae)". SHILAP Revista de Lepidopterología. 37 (147): 371–384.
Razowski, J. & Krüger, M. (2013). "An illustrated catalogue of the specimens of Tortricidae in the Iziko South African Museum, Cape Town (Lepidoptera: Tortricidae)". SHILAP Revista de Lepidopterología. 41 (162): 213–240.

Archipini